David Gordon Green is an American filmmaker. He directed the dramas George Washington (2000), All the Real Girls (2003), and Snow Angels (2007), as well as the thriller Undertow (2004), all of which he wrote or co-wrote.

In 2008, Green transitioned into comedy, directing the films Pineapple Express (2008), Your Highness and The Sitter (both 2011). He returned to his dramatic roots with the independent films  Prince Avalanche and Joe (both 2013), followed by the films Manglehorn (2014), Our Brand Is Crisis (2015), and Stronger (2017). Green also directed a trilogy of slasher films in the Halloween franchise: Halloween (2018), Halloween Kills (2021) and Halloween Ends (2022), which he co-wrote with frequent collaborator Danny McBride.

Green also directed episodes of the comedy series Eastbound & Down (2009–2013), Red Oaks (2014–17), Vice Principals (2016–17), and The Righteous Gemstones (2019–present), on all of which he additionally served as executive producer.

Early life

Green, one of four children, was born in Little Rock, Arkansas, and grew up in Richardson, Texas. His mother, Jean Ann (née Hunter), was a Lamaze instructor, and his father, Hubert Gordon Green, Jr., was a medical school dean. Green attended Richardson High School, the University of Texas at Austin, and the University of North Carolina School of the Arts, where he studied film directing. He currently lives in Charleston, South Carolina.

Career 
As a college student, Green made the two short films, Pleasant Grove and Physical Pinball, at the North Carolina School of the Arts prior to his feature film debut in 2000, the critically acclaimed George Washington, which he both wrote and directed. He followed that with All the Real Girls in 2003 and Undertow in 2004.

In 2007, he directed Snow Angels, his first film of another author's screenplay, adapted from the Stewart O'Nan novel. The film debuted at Sundance in January and stars Sam Rockwell and Kate Beckinsale. It was released by Warner Independent Pictures. Green directed the Seth Rogen buddy comedy Pineapple Express in 2008, and the HBO series Eastbound & Down, for which he directed twelve episodes and served as a consulting producer. He is the creator of the animated series Good Vibes. He directed the comedy The Sitter, released in December 2011. Green also directed and co-wrote Prince Avalanche in 2013.

Green directed the horror sequel Halloween (2018), produced by Jason Blum, executive produced by John Carpenter, and co-written by Green and Danny McBride. He also directed its sequels Halloween Kills, released in October 2021, and Halloween Ends, released in October 2022.

In April 2020, HBO was announced to be developing a Hellraiser television series that would serve as "an elevated continuation and expansion" of its mythology with Mark Verheiden and Michael Dougherty writing the series and Green directing several episodes; the three will also be executive producing the series with Danny McBride, Jody Hill, Brandon James and Roy Lee of Vertigo Entertainment. In December 2020, it was announced Green will direct a new installment of The Exorcist franchise which will be a direct sequel to William Friedkin's 1973 film adaptation of the 1971 novel.

Influences 

Green's favorite films are, in order, Thunderbolt and Lightfoot, 2001: A Space Odyssey, The Gravy Train, The Bad News Bears, Deliverance, Nashville and One Flew Over the Cuckoo's Nest.

It has been suggested, even by the director himself, that Green's films take a lot of influence from the works of fellow Texan Terrence Malick. Malick himself served as an executive producer of Green's 2004 film Undertow.

Filmography

Feature films

Actor

Television

See also 
David Gordon Green's unrealized projects

References

External links 

1975 births
American people of English descent
Film directors from Arkansas
Living people
University of North Carolina School of the Arts alumni
Artists from Little Rock, Arkansas
American male screenwriters
American film producers
American television producers
American television directors
Fantasy film directors
Horror film directors
Silver Bear for Best Director recipients
Screenwriters from Arkansas